The 2006 Tour de Pologne road cycling race took place from September 4 until September 10. German Stefan Schumacher won the last the two last stages on his way to capturing his second consecutive stage race; previously winning the Eneco Tour of Benelux.

Stages

Stage 1: 04-09-2006: Pułtusk-Olsztyn, 214 km

Stage 2: 05-09-2006: Ostróda-Elbląg, 119.6 km

Stage 3: 06-09-2006: Gdańsk-Toruń, 225.5 km

Stage 4: 07-09-2006: Bydgoszcz-Poznań, 182 km

Stage 5: 08-09-2006: Legnica-Jelenia Góra, 192 km

Stage 6: 09-09-2006: Szczawno Zdrój-Karpacz, 162.4 km

Stage 7: 10-09-2006: Jelenia Góra-Karpacz, 126 km

General Standings
Final (After Stage 7)

KOM Classification

The leader of the climbers classification (or King of the Mountains) is determined by obtaining points for reaching 19 mountain primes ahead of the competition.  The classification leader will wear green jersey. Order of riders will be decided by the total number of points scored during the mountain primes.

Points Classification

Best Team

Jersey progress chart

External links

Race website
Tour of Poland on cyclingnews.com

Tour de Pologne
2006
Tour de Pologne
September 2006 sports events in Europe